Bernardas Vasiliauskas (28 April 1938 – 21 February 2022) was a Lithuanian pianist and organist.

Biography
Vasiliauskas was born in Kaunas on 28 April 1938. Vasiliauskas finished at the Lithuanian Academy of Music and Theatre as a pianist in 1961 and as an organist in 1966. In 1968 he won first prize in the Mikalojus Konstantinas Čiurlionis Competition of Pianists and Organists. He played mostly 19th- and 20th-century music for the pipe organ. Vasiliauskas had recorded 15 LPs and 12 CDs. He died in Vilnius on 21 February 2022, at the age of 83.

References

External links
Vasiliauskas plays J. S. Bach Toccata and Fugue d - minor BWV565 -YouTube
Interview in Bernardinai.lt
 

1938 births
2022 deaths
21st-century male musicians
21st-century organists
Lithuanian Academy of Music and Theatre alumni
Lithuanian organists
Male organists
Musicians from Kaunas